is a railway station in the town of Hanawa, Fukushima, Japan operated by East Japan Railway Company (JR East).

Lines

Station layout
The station has two opposed side platforms connected to the station building by a footbridge. The station is staffed.

Platforms

History
Iwaki-Hanawa Station opened on October 10, 1931. The station was absorbed into the JR East network upon the privatization of the Japanese National Railways (JNR) on April 1, 1987.

Passenger statistics
In fiscal 2018, the station was used by an average of 188 passengers daily (boarding passengers only).

Surrounding area

Hanawa Town Hall
Hanawa Post Office

See also
 List of Railway Stations in Japan

References

External links
 
  

Stations of East Japan Railway Company
Railway stations in Fukushima Prefecture
Suigun Line
Railway stations in Japan opened in 1931
Hanawa, Fukushima